Matthew Jukes is a wine writer in the UK.

He publishes a number of annual wine Reports including the 100 Best Australian Wines (the thirteenth 100 Best List was launched in May 2016), the Bordeaux En Primeur Report, the Burgundy En Primeur Report and, released for the first time in early 2017, his Piemonte Report.

He regularly lectures and runs tastings for both corporate and private clients.

Career history

Jukes started his career in the wine industry in 1987 working with wine consultant James Rogers at the Barnes Wine Shop, London SW13. From there, Matthew moved into buying for Bibendum Restaurant & Oyster Bar, London SW3, winning awards for his wine list, and then into radio when journalism started to become his focus. After 3 years on a weekly radio slot for the BBC, Channel 4 approached Jukes to host 'Wine Hunt'. Jukes then went on to write 'The Wine Book' which was later serialised by the Daily Mail. Jukes was offered a wine column in the Daily Mail's Weekend Magazine.

Awards
In January 2012, Matthew Jukes was awarded the Honorary Australian of the Year Award by the Australia Day Foundation. It recognises a non Australian resident of the UK who displays "Australian characteristics" or has contributed significantly to Australia.

In May 2011, Off Licence News voted Matthew the most influential wine writer in the UK.

His book, Taste Food & Wine, co-written with Tyson Stelzer, won the Australian Food Media Award for Best Food and Writing.

In 2002, Matthew won the International Wine and Spirit Competition’s Trophy for Wine Communicator of the Year.

Publications
Quintessentially's 100 Most Iconic Wine Estates

The Wine Book: Change the way you think about wines of the world (2 editions)

Wine – everything you ever wanted to know but were afraid to ask (2 editions)

The Wine List – The Top 250 wines of the year (6 editions)

Taste Food & Wine, in conjunction with Tyson Stelzer, Australia (3 editions)

References

British male journalists
Wine writers
Living people
Year of birth missing (living people)